Calamonastes is a genus of birds in the family Cisticolidae. It contains African wren-warblers.

Species
Barred wren-warbler, Calamonastes fasciolatus
Grey wren-warbler, Calamonastes simplex
Stierling's wren-warbler, Calamonastes stierlingi
Miombo wren-warbler, Calamonastes undosus

References
Catalogue of Birds in the British Museum 7 p. 94, 133 
 
Ryan, Peter (2006). Family Cisticolidae (Cisticolas and allies). pp. 378–492 in del Hoyo J., Elliott A. & Christie D.A. (2006) Handbook of the Birds of the World. Volume 11. Old World Flycatchers to Old World Warblers Lynx Edicions, Barcelona 
 Nguembock B.; Fjeldsa J.; Tillier A.; Pasquet E. (2007): A phylogeny for the Cisticolidae (Aves: Passeriformes) based on nuclear and mitochondrial DNA sequence data, and a re-interpretation of a unique nest-building specialization. Molecular Phylogenetics and Evolution'' 42: 272–286.

 
Bird genera